Talia Barnet-Hepples (born 7 October 1999) is an Australian representative rowing coxswain. She is an Australian national champion, has represented at senior World Championships and won a gold medal at the 2022 World Rowing Cup.

Club and state rowing
Barnet-Hepples was raised in Sydney and attended Queenwood School for Girls where she took up rowing. Her senior club rowing has been from the Sydney University Boat Club. 

She first made state selection for New South Wales in the 2017 women's youth eight which contested the Bicentennial Cup at the Interstate Regatta within the Australian Rowing Championships.  She made a second New South Wales youth eight appearance in 2018. 

Barnet-Hepples steered the New South Wales women's eight to a Queen's Cup victory at the 2019 Interstate Regatta within the Australian Rowing Championships.  In Sydney University colours she won gold in the open women's eight title at the 2019 Australian Championships and steered a composite crew to silver in the same event in 2022. She again coxed the New South Wales women's eight in the Queen's Cup at the 2022 Interstate Regatta within the Australian Rowing Championships.

International representative rowing
In March 2022 Barnet-Hepples was selected in the Australian training squad to prepare for the 2022 international season and the 2022 World Rowing Championships.  She steered the Australian women's eight at World Rowing Cups II and III to a bronze in Poznan and taking gold in Lucerne.  At the 2022 World Rowing Championships at Racize, she was again in the stern of the Australian women's senior eight. They made the A final and finished in fifth place.

References

External links
Barnet-Hepples at World Rowing

1999 births
Living people
Australian female rowers
People educated at Queenwood School for Girls
Coxswains (rowing)
21st-century Australian women